Li-Ning Company Limited is a Chinese sportswear and sports equipment company founded by former Olympic gymnast Li Ning. The company endorses a number of athletes and teams worldwide.

History
The company was founded in 1989 by Li Ning, a former Chinese Olympic gymnast. As of 2015, Li Ning remains the Chairman of the company's board of directors. In 2005, Li-Ning created a joint-venture with French sports apparel company, AIGLE, giving Li-Ning the exclusive right to be the sole distributor of AIGLE's products in China for 50 years. In 2006, Li-Ning posted revenues of US$418 million, and total profits of about US$39 million. As of March 2007, there were 4,297 Li-Ning retail stores. The company directly owns some of the retail stores while others are franchised.

In January 2010, Li-Ning opened its U.S. headquarters and flagship store in Portland, Oregon. In 2010, as part of the 'Revitalization' of the brand, Li-Ning released a new logo and the new slogan "让改变发生" "Ràng Gǎibiàn Fāshēng" in Chinese, translated to "Let the Change Occur" in English. In January 2011, Li-Ning entered into a partnership with Chicago-based Acquity Group to expand its U.S. distribution and brand awareness.

In April 2012, Li-Ning was awarded the highest distinction of "Outstanding Contribution to Quality Standardization Award" in knitwear division at the Third National Textile Standardization Technical Committee's inaugural meeting held in Zhuhai, Guangdong. In September 2012, Li-Ning signed into a partnership with NBA player Dwyane Wade.

In 2013, The Group recorded revenue of RMB2,906 million, which represents a decrease of 24.6% year-on-year, due to near-term focus on sell-in reductions, inventory clearance, and reducing the number of stores. The Group projected a net loss of up to 820 million yuan (US$13.19 million) for 2014, the third straight year where it was unprofitable.

In 2019, Li-Ning reported revenues increased 32 percent reached 13.87 billion yuan against 10.51 billion yuan  a year ago. Net profit attributable to equity holders increased to ¥1.5 billion from ¥715.3 million which vaulted 110 percent.

In 2020, Li-Ning saw its revenue increase 4.2 percent year-on-year to 14.46 billion yuan ($2.22 billion), the net profit increased on a comparative basis by 34.2 percent to 1.7 billion yuan ($261 million).

On 7 March 2022, the world largest sovereign wealth fund, the Government Pension Fund of Norway excluded and divested from Li-Ning. The reason for this exclusion was an "unacceptable risk that the company contributes to serious human rights violations".

Marketing

The company has used sponsorship deals, particularly with athletes and sports teams, both in China and abroad, to raise its profile.

In 2006, the company entered strategic collaborations with the National Basketball Association, the Association of Tennis Professionals, the Chinese University Basketball Association, and the Chinese Football Association. It also signed sponsorship deals with the Chinese national teams and the Sudan track and field team. The company will also provide apparel for the Argentina national basketball team at international events including the 2008 Summer Olympics and 2012 Summer Olympics. A similar deal was made with the Swedish Olympic Committee.

Indian Olympic Association had signed a sponsorship deal with Li Ning for the Rio 2016 Summer Olympics.

In celebration of its 30th anniversary, the brand held a fashion show on January 18, 2020, during Paris menswear fashion week. The show also showcased a 10-piece capsule collection in collaboration with Jackie Chan and a sneaker done up with Dwyane Wade.

2008 Beijing Olympics

Li-Ning sought sponsorship opportunities related to the 2008 Summer Olympics held in Beijing, China. The company arranged to outfit every presenter for broadcaster CCTV-5, the sports channel of the Chinese Central Television. Li-Ning also sponsored the Chinese national teams of Gymnastics, Table Tennis, Archery, and Diving. It also sponsored the Spanish basketball team, as well as the Argentine and Swedish Olympics teams.

In a now famous case of ambush marketing (a subset of guerilla marketing), when entire countries were tuned to the 2008 Summer Olympics opening ceremony, millions saw Li Ning light the torch. Though the Li-Ning company was not an official sponsor of the games, it had still associated itself with the games through its role as an equipment supplier for several Chinese Olympic teams, and through Li's status as a Chinese sports and business icon. Consequently, the ceremony generated tremendous exposure for Li's eponymous company to the chagrin of official sports apparel supplier Adidas, as viewers did not realize that he had been fully dressed in Adidas as per its sponsorship rights to the Games. The company's share price increased by over 3% on the first day of trading after the opening ceremony.

Sponsorship

Li-Ning was an official marketing partner of the National Basketball Association and has/had sponsorship deals with ten players: Baron Davis (retired), Shaquille O'Neal (retired), Damon Jones (retired), José Calderón (retired), Cleanthony Early of the Rio Grande Valley Vipers, Glenn Robinson III of the Golden State Warriors, Evan Turner of the Atlanta Hawks, Dwyane Wade of the Miami Heat (lifetime contract), and CJ McCollum of the Portland Trail Blazers.

In 2006, O'Neal signed a four-year deal with Li-Ning, reportedly worth US$1.25 million, the largest deal made by the company, and the highest profile signing of an American sports star by a Chinese company. O'Neal cited former teammate Damon Jones and the Spanish national basketball team's deal with Li-Ning as influences on his decision to sign with Li-Ning.

Previously, Li-Ning also operated as shirt sponsor for the Vietnam national football team from 2006 to 2008, which saw Vietnam's prominent rise to successes in 2007 AFC Asian Cup and 2008 AFF Championship.

In 2010, Li-Ning became the official shirt sponsor for Tajikistan's tennis team, as well as for FC Istiklol.

In 2012, Dwyane Wade left the Jordan Brand for Li-Ning. The deal is worth $10 million.

In 2019, Li-Ning announced that it would not do business with the Houston Rockets after the General Manager of the NBA team tweeted in support of the 2019–20 Hong Kong protests. Also, Li-Ning along with Sunlight Sports Pvt. Ltd. (representative and distributor of Li-Ning in India) signed sponsorship deals with Indian badminton players P V Sindhu and Kidambi Srikanth.

Olympic Committees
 Indonesian Olympic Committee
 Mexican Olympic Committee

Basketball
 Beijing Ducks
 Guangdong Southern Tigers
 Shanghai Sharks
 Zhejiang Lions
 Kuala Lumpur Dragons
 Capitanes de Ciudad de México
 Cleanthony Early
 Glenn Robinson III
 Evan Turner
 Frank Mason III
 CJ McCollum
 D'Angelo Russell
 Jimmy Butler
 Udonis Haslem
 Fred VanVleet

Football

National football 
 (Asian Games and Sea Games only)

Club football 
 Hunan Billows
 Shaanxi Chang'an Athletic F.C.
 Wuhan Three Towns
 Kuala Lumpur City F.C. (from 2023 season)
 F.C. Chitwan
 Jawalakhel YC
 Viettel FC

Tennis 
 Tajikistan Fed Cup team

Winter sports people 
 Max Parrot

Formerly

Basketball Players 

 Baron Davis 
 Shaquille O'Neal
 Damon Jones
 José Calderón
 Dwyane Wade

Former Club football 
 Espanyol (2010-2012) 
 Celta de Vigo (2010-2013)
 Sevilla (2011-2012)
 Tractor SC (2017-2018)
 Persepolis (2018-2019)
 Esteghlal Khuzestan
 Puebla (2018-2019)
 Vardar (2008-2012)
 Istiklol (2010-2012)
 Phu Dong (2019-2022)

Former National football teams

Environmental practices 
In July 2011, Li-Ning - along with other major sportswear and fashion brands including Nike, Adidas and Abercrombie & Fitch - was the subject of a report by the environmental group Greenpeace entitled 'Dirty Laundry'. Li-Ning, along with Abercrombie & Fitch, Adidas, Bauer Hockey, Calvin Klein, Converse, Cortefiel, H&M, Lacoste, Nike, Phillips-Van Heusen Corporation (PVH Corp) and Puma, were accused of working with suppliers in China who, according to the findings of the report, contribute to the pollution of the Yangtze and Pearl Rivers. Samples taken from one facility belonging to the Youngor Group located on the Yangtze River Delta and another belonging to the Well Dyeing Factory Ltd. located on a tributary of the Pearl River Delta revealed the presence of hazardous and persistent hormone disruptor chemicals, including alkylphenols, perfluorinated compounds and perfluorooctane sulfonate.

References

External links

 

Athletic shoe brands
Badminton equipment manufacturers
Sporting goods manufacturers of China
Chinese brands
Chinese companies established in 1989
Civilian-run enterprises of China
Companies listed on the Hong Kong Stock Exchange
Companies based in Beijing
Retail companies of China
Shoe brands
Shoe companies of China
Sporting goods brands
Sportswear brands